The Roaring 1980s is the name of the economic boom in Sweden during the mid-late 1980s.

Background
The years after the 1973 oil crisis was a time of economic recession. In October 1982 a devaluation of the Swedish currency was done. On 21 November 1985, the credit market became free. and the international economic boom that had begun spread into Sweden.

Trends
A yuppie culture developed at the Stockholm Stock Exchange. Mobile telephones were also known by the popular nickname "yuppienalle". ("Yuppie's teddy bear") The term finansvalp ("finance puppy") was common when referring to young businessmen. The contemporary yuppie culture was criticized by, among others, Stig Malm in his 1987 First of May speech.

Buying and selling art also became popular within the world of businesses.

Culture and other entertainment

The Stockholm Globe Arena was built between 1986-1988 and opened in 1989. It has been described as an expression of the contemporary optimism for the future. Several summer parks opened during this period.

Popular culture
The 1993 Magnus Uggla song Mitt decennium describes the phenomena.

See also
Swedish banking rescue
Roaring Twenties
Post–World War II economic expansion

References

1980s economic history
1980s in Sweden
Economic booms
Economic history of Sweden